Jankowice Małe  (German Klein Jenkwitz) is a village in the administrative district of Gmina Oława, within Oława County, Lower Silesian Voivodeship, in south-western Poland. Prior to 1945 it was in Germany and was called Klein Jenkwitz.

Notable residents
Richard Peter (1895–1977), German press photographer and photojournalist

References

Villages in Oława County